Virak is both a surname and a given name. Notable people with the name include:

 Ou Virak (born 1976), Cambodian activist
 Virak Dara (born 1947), Cambodian actress

See also
 Vira (given name)